HMS Boyne was an 80-gun third-rate ship of the line of the Royal Navy, launched at Deptford Dockyard on 21 May 1692.

She was rebuilt to the 1706 Establishment at Blackwall Yard, mounting her guns on three instead of her original two gundecks, though she was still classified as a third rate. She was relaunched from Blackwall on 26 March 1708. Her second rebuild took place at Deptford, where she was reconstructed according to the 1733 proposals of the 1719 Establishment, and relaunched on 28 May 1739.

The Boyne was part of Vice-Admiral Edward Vernon's fleet and took part in the expedition to Cartagena de Indias during the War of Jenkins' Ear.

Boyne was broken up in 1763.

Notes

References

Lavery, Brian (2003) The Ship of the Line - Volume 1: The development of the battlefleet 1650-1850. Conway Maritime Press. .

Ships of the line of the Royal Navy
1690s ships
Ships built in Deptford
Ships built by the Blackwall Yard